Pier Francesco Mola, called Il Ticinese (9 February 1612 – 13 May 1666) was an Italian painter of the High Baroque, mainly active around Rome.

Biography
Mola was born at Coldrerio (now in Ticino, Switzerland). At the age of four, he moved to Rome with his father Giovanni Battista Mola, a painter. With the exception of the years 1633–40 and 1641–47, during which he resided in Venice and Bologna, respectively, he lived for the rest of his life in Rome.

His early training was with the late mannerist painter Cavalier d'Arpino, and he worked under the classicizing Francesco Albani.

His masterpiece as a fresco painter is widely considered to be the fresco in the gallery of Alexander VII in the Quirinal Palace  Gallery, entitled Joseph making himself known to his Brethren (1657). However, Mola is considered to have been better as a painter of small pictures, especially landscapes. He made six versions of The Flight into Egypt, the earliest and best  of which is the first one, The Rest on the Flight into Egypt.

He was elected Principe of the Accademia di San Luca, the Roman artists' professional association, in 1662, but his last years were neither profitable nor prolific. Among his pupils were Jean-Baptiste Forest, Antonio Gherardi, and Giuseppe Bonati.

With his looser style and handling, more naturalistic palette, and interest in exploring landscape elements, Mola differs from the prevailing, highly-theoretical classicism of such leading 17th-century Roman painters as Andrea Sacchi.

Notes

Sources

 Pier Francesco Mola 1612 - 1666, Electa 1989, Lugano, Museo Cantonale d'Arte

1612 births
1666 deaths
People from Ticino
17th-century Italian painters
Italian male painters
Italian Baroque painters